Robinson Ekspeditionen 2021 is the twenty-second season of the popular Danish reality television series Robinson Ekspeditionen. After a year hiatus due to the COVID-19 pandemic, the season returns with 22 contestants split into two tribes, competing against each other whilst trying to survive. This season moves to a new location, filmed in the Dominican Republic. The season premieres on 6 September 2021.

Contestants
Notable cast members include Amanda Sascha from the reality television series De dyre piger, former football player Martin Svensson, Ralf Østergaard Christensen, husband of television host Lisbeth Østergaard and Ninos Oraha, founder of the popular donut chain Bronuts.

Season Summary

Voting history

References

External links

Robinson Ekspeditionen seasons
2021 Danish television seasons
Danish reality television series